Patrick van der Vorst (born 2 May 1971) is a Deacon of the Roman Catholic Diocese of Westminster and former entrepreneur, dealer, art expert and winner on BBC's Dragons Den.

Early career 
Van der Vorst is the grandson of Gaston Depre, founder of animal nutrition company Group Depre.

Van der Vorst attended the Katholieke Universiteit in Leuven, Belgium where he graduated in law. In 1995 he moved to London, where he has lived ever since. He started his career at Sotheby’s Billingshurst in 1996 and transferred in 1997 to Bond Street in London, working first in the impressionist and contemporary art departments, before moving into the furniture department. At age 28 he became Deputy Director at Sotheby's and at 31 a director and head of continental furniture, specialising in 18th century French furniture. In these years he helped organise sales for Elton John's London home, the Easton Neston Sale, Thurn & Taxis, etc. At the age of 39 he left Sotheby's to set up his own company, ValueMyStuff.

Companies

Sotheby's 
Patrick worked at Sotheby's from 1995 to 2010, where he was a Senior Director of the company.

ValueMyStuff 

Founded in 2009, ValueMyStuff is an online antique valuations service. In 2010 van der Vorst appeared on Dragons' Den and secured a £100,000 ($170,000) investment from Deborah Meaden and Theo Paphitis. It was bought in 2015 by Auctionata for an undisclosed sum to the new owners the De Rijck family . After Auctionata's 2017 insolvency, ValueMyStuff was sold as a going concern. Van der Vorst bought back the ValueMyStuff assets in January 2017. After additional ValueMyStuff product launches, Van der Vorst sold the company in October 2018 to the Swedish owned Barneby’s group, the leading search engine for art & antiques. Currently, ValueMyStuff offers all kind of appraisals services, disputing its leadership with Appraisily.com.

St George Valuations 
Alongside ValueMyStuff, van der Vorst also founded St George Valuations in 2011 and is the premium brand of his online antiques business ValueMyStuff. St George Valuations conducts in-person valuation assignments, appraising and cataloguing the contents of country estates, museum collections and/or individual items, from silver spoons to contemporary art. Over 500 country estates and public collections have been valued.

Christian Art 
Van der Vorst launched http://www.christian.art a website that sends out daily emails, listing the Gospel text for the day, alongside a work of art relevant to that reading. The mission is simple: Art and Christianity no longer resonate as an inherent, magnificent pairing. Actually it is a feeling that goes both ways: most Christians no longer see Art as being important or even as a relevant way of promoting the faith; and non believers don’t value Christianity as having been at the forefront of the arts throughout the centuries, responsible for creating some of the most magnificent artworks out there. The websites' offering is simple: one newsletter a day is sent out with the Gospel reading of the day, alongside a work of art that Patrick believes is poignant, reflective and appropriate to that reading. A short reflection accompanies the work of art.

Stukken van Mensen - Belgian TV 
Patrick van der Vorst has participated as a judge/dealer for 5 seasons/years in the Belgian TV series 'Stukken van Mensen' on Vier TV in Belgium.

Seminarian for the Diocese of Westminster 
In September 2019, Van der Vorst started seminary for the Diocese of Westminster at the Pontifical Beda College in Rome, training for the Catholic priesthood.

Some writings and publications 
Van der Vorst is a contributor to the Huffington Post.

Appearance on BBC's Dragons Den

Deborah Meaden website page on Patrick

Het Laatste Nieuws article

Interview CNBC TV

Nieuws 365 article

Video on ValueMyStuff

Article De Morgen

Management today Article

Book launch Belgian radio - video

Kerknet interview

References

Living people
1971 births
Businesspeople from Bruges

External links
From Riches to Religion, BBC World Service feature on Patrick van der Vorst, 14 October 2022